The 2nd constituency of Vienne is a French legislative constituency in the Vienne département.  It is represented in the XVth legislature by Sacha Houlié, of Renaissance.

Overview 
The constituency covers the western part of the département. It includes the large town of Poitiers.

Deputies

Election results

2022

 
 
 
 
 
 
 
|-
| colspan="8" bgcolor="#E9E9E9"|
|-

2017

 
 
 
 
 
 
 
|-
| colspan="8" bgcolor="#E9E9E9"|
|-

2012

 
 
 
 
 
 
|-
| colspan="8" bgcolor="#E9E9E9"|
|-

2007

 
 
 
 
 
 
 
|-
| colspan="8" bgcolor="#E9E9E9"|
|-

2002

 
 
 
 
 
 
|-
| colspan="8" bgcolor="#E9E9E9"|
|-

1997

Sources

2